The XTM Arena Tour, also known as TAEMIN ARENA TOUR 2019 ～X™～, was the second Japanese concert tour by South Korean singer Taemin. It commenced in Sapporo on June 8, 2019, and concluded in Chōfu on August 12, 2019. The tour spanned 17 shows across seven cities, attracting approximately 150,000 attendees.

Background
Taemin released his self-titled Japanese studio album in November 2018. On March 29, 2019, his agency SM Entertainment announced that he would be embarking on his first Japanese arena tour in June, following on from his 2018 tour, Sirius. 14 concerts were planned, covering six cities.  Following an appearance on Japanese talk show Shabekuri 007, Taemin announced the tour's title would be XTM (stylised as X™). "X" represents Taemin's fashion, music and dance, with the aim of showing his unique artistry like a trademark. The tour marked Taemin's return to Nippon Budokan, where he held his first solo concert in 2017, and he expressed that he wanted to show his growth. He scaled up his performances in comparison to his previous tour, accounting for the larger venues. Rino Nakasone served as director. Taemin previewed songs from his upcoming Famous EP at the concert. Three additional performances in August were added to the schedule later on to accommodate demand. The final performance was broadcast on Abema on November 10, 2019.

Set list
This set list is representative of the show on August 12, 2019. It does not represent all concerts for the duration of the tour.

 "Tiger"
 "Press Your Number"
 "One by One"
 "Want"
 "Eclipse"
 "Truth"
 "Mars"
 "Stone Heart" / "Do it Baby"
 "Shadow"
 "Into the Rhythm"
 "Colours"
 "Already"
 "Artistic Groove"
 "Pretty Boy"
 "Play Me"
 "Drip Drop"
 "Slave"
 "I'm Crying"
 "Itsuka Kokode"
 "Sekaide Ichiban Aishitahito"
 "Sayonara Hitori"
 "Holy Water"
Encore
 "Famous"
 "Move"
 "What's This Feeling"
 "Danger"

Shows

References

2019 concert tours
Concert tours of Japan